Wybunbury is a civil parish in Cheshire East, England. It contains eight buildings that are recorded in the National Heritage List for England as designated listed buildings.  Of these, one is listed at Grade II*, the middle of the three grades, and the others are at Grade II, the lowest grade. The parish contains the village of Wybunbury, and is otherwise rural. The listed buildings consist of houses, a school, a public house, a war memorial, and the tower of an otherwise demolished church.

Key

Buildings

References

Citations

Sources

 

Listed buildings in the Borough of Cheshire East
Lists of listed buildings in Cheshire